Law Speed is the first album by French/Italian post-rock band Permanent Fatal Error, a project by Olivier Manchion, founder member of the band Ulan Bator. The album was recorded in Italy at URS studio (Villa Minozzo, Emilia-Romagna).

Track listing

"|||"  – 0:06
"A Pic"  – 3:59
"Nord"  – 3:24
"BLU"  – 5:18
"B#Side <part1"  – 2:23
"B#Side _part2_"  – 4:24
"B#Side part3>"  – 2:13
"Low.Law.Speed  – 9:58
"Sunflowers"  – 5:39
"Deaf.Blues"  – 0:44
"Treep"  – 5:29

Musicians 

Olivier Manchion : acoustic-guitar, bass, loops, slide, bass-organ, e, voice
Giulio C. Vetrone : snake-guitar, wave-guitar, bell-guitar, triangle, voice
Nicolas Marmin : bass, electronics, distorgan, voice
Francesco Billét : drums, egg, bell, 123

Guested musicians

Massimo Guidetti: Trumpet (B#Side _part2_)
Bi: Vocals (B#Side _part2_)

About "Law Speed" 

 source: http://2006.avantgardefestival.de/

 source: http://www.rermegacorp.com/Merchant2/merchant.mvc?Screen=PROD&Product_Code=Wallace40&Category_Code=&Store_Code=RM

2004 albums